Francisco Miguel Narváez Machón (born 26 April 1972), known as Kiko, is a Spanish former professional footballer who spent most of his career with Atlético Madrid.

A centre forward with tremendous technical ability and field vision, he possessed nonetheless a poor aerial game despite being almost 190 cm tall. In ten La Liga seasons (also played one year with his main club in Segunda División), he amassed totals of 271 games and 60 goals.

Kiko was a squad member at the 1992 Summer Olympics as the Spain national team won gold, on home soil. Additionally, he appeared at full level in one World Cup and one European Championship.

Club career

Cádiz
Born in Jerez de la Frontera, Province of Cádiz, Kiko's career began with local Cádiz CF, and he first appeared in La Liga on 14 April 1991 in a 2–3 home loss against Athletic Bilbao. Even though he played in only five further matches in the season he was intimately connected with the Andalusia club's fate as, on 9 June, in only 25 minutes of play, he gained a penalty kick and scored an 83-minute winner in a 2–1 home win over Real Zaragoza; the team would miraculously retain their status, after the playoffs against CD Málaga.

Atlético
After two more seasons as an undisputed starter Kiko moved, alongside teammate José María Quevedo to Atlético Madrid, upon Cádiz's 1993 relegation. There, he developed into one of Spain's most important footballers during the 90s, being an instrumental unit in Atlético's historical double in 1995–96, with goals and assists alike.

Atlético was relegated in 2000, but Kiko stayed with the club for a further campaign, not managing any goals in 52 league appearances. He finished out his career with a five-month spell at CF Extremadura also in Segunda División in 2002, teaming up with another longtime league player, Pier.

International career
Kiko was capped 26 times for Spain, and scored four goals. His debut came on 16 December 1992, in a 1994 FIFA World Cup qualifier against Latvia where he played the full 90 minutes.

Kiko took part in UEFA Euro 1996 and the 1998 World Cup. He scored once against Bulgaria in the latter tournament, during a 6–1 thrashing, though this did not count for anything as Spain were knocked out in the group stage.

Previously, Kiko represented the country at the 1992 Summer Olympics in Barcelona. He scored a last-minute winner against Poland in the final, a 3–2 victory, his second of the game.

International goals
Scores and results list Spain's goal tally first, score column indicates score after each Kiko goal.

Honours
Atlético Madrid
La Liga: 1995–96
Copa del Rey: 1995–96

Spain U23
Summer Olympic Games: 1992

Spain U21
UEFA European Under-21 Championship third place: 1994

References

External links
 
 
 
 
 

1972 births
Living people
Footballers from Jerez de la Frontera
Spanish footballers
Association football forwards
La Liga players
Segunda División players
Tercera División players
Cádiz CF B players
Cádiz CF players
Atlético Madrid footballers
CF Extremadura footballers
Spain youth international footballers
Spain under-21 international footballers
Spain under-23 international footballers
Spain international footballers
UEFA Euro 1996 players
1998 FIFA World Cup players
Footballers at the 1992 Summer Olympics
Olympic footballers of Spain
Olympic medalists in football
Olympic gold medalists for Spain
Medalists at the 1992 Summer Olympics
Spanish association football commentators